Greeney is a surname. Notable people with the surname include:

 Harold F. Greeney (born 1972), American biologist
 Norm Greeney (1910–1985), American football player

See also
 Greaney
 Greany
 Greenie (disambiguation)